Joana Soutinho (born 8 November 1977) is a Portuguese swimmer. She competed in two events at the 1996 Summer Olympics.

References

1977 births
Living people
Portuguese female swimmers
Olympic swimmers of Portugal
Swimmers at the 1996 Summer Olympics
Place of birth missing (living people)